Agence Kampuchea Press (AKP) is the national news agency of Cambodia.

External links
 
 Original site on Camnet

News agencies based in Cambodia
Mass media in Cambodia
State media